Father Rosario Stroscio (1922 in Sicily – 9 June 2019) was Roman Catholic Salesian priest and exorcist.

In 1997, Father Stroscio was called in by the Archbishop of Calcutta, Archbishop Henry Sebastian D'Souza to pray over the 87-year-old hospitalized Mother Teresa who had been hospitalized for heart problems. Mother Teresa was suffering from insomnia and acting strangely. The Archbishop said of the situation that, "when doctors said they could not find a medical reason for her sleeplessness, I thought she might be getting attacked by the devil." After Father Stroscio prayed over her, she was calm and slept peacefully.

Some news outlets carried the story that Mother Teresa had undergone an exorcism, but the Archbishop later explained that although Father Stroscio used a prayer found in the rite of exorcism,  "I did not think she was possessed by an evil spirit," and so no formal exorcism took place.

References

External links 
 What is an exorcism?

Stroscio
1922 births
2019 deaths
Italian exorcists